The Rotterdam Open, also known by its sponsored name ABN AMRO Open, and formely known as: ABN AMRO World Tennis Tournament (1991-2021), is a professional men's tennis tournament played on indoor hard courts. It is part of the ATP Tour 500 series on the ATP Tour and has been held annually at the Rotterdam Ahoy in Rotterdam, Netherlands.

History
The first Rotterdam Open tennis tournament was held in November 1972 and was won by Arthur Ashe. The following year the tournament was not organized because it switched to a March date. Originally the Rotterdam Open was an event of the World Championship Tennis circuit and in 1978 became part of the Grand Prix tennis circuit. Since 1990 it has been part of the ATP Tour.

In 1984 the singles final between Ivan Lendl and Jimmy Connors was interrupted in the 2nd set (6–0, 1–0) due to a bomb alarm and the match was not finished as Lendl was not prepared to play on.

Since 2004, former Dutch tennis player Richard Krajicek has been the tournament director.

A record 115,894 people attended the 2012 edition tournament when Roger Federer returned for the first time in seven years. This record was broken in 2018 when 120,000 fans attended after Federer accepted a wildcard into the event after a five-year absence.

Past finals
In the singles, Arthur Ashe (1972, 1975–76) and Roger Federer (2005, 2012 and 2018) hold the record for most titles with three, while Ashe, Stefan Edberg (1986–87), Nicolas Escudé (2001–02), Robin Söderling (2010–11) and Gaël Monfils (2019–20) co-hold the record for most consecutive titles with two. Federer (2001, 2005, 2012, and 2018) and Jimmy Connors (1978, 1981–82, and 1984) co-hold the record for most finals contested at four.

In the doubles, Anders Järryd (1987, 1991, 1993, 1995), Nenad Zimonjić (2009–10, 2012–13) and Nicolas Mahut (2014, 2016, 2018, 2020) co-hold the record for most titles with four, while Frew McMillan holds the record for most back-to-back titles with three straight wins (1974–76).

Singles

Doubles

†

Tour history
Since its inception in 1972 the Rotterdam Open has been part of three major tennis circuits: WCT circuit (1972–1977), Grand Prix circuit (1978–1989) and ATP Tour (1990–).

 1972–1977 : WCT circuit
 1978–1989 : Grand Prix circuit
 1990–1998 : ATP World Series
 1999–current : ATP International Series Gold / ATP Tour 500

Sponsors
 ABN AMRO – main sponsor
 Rotterdam Ahoy – licence holder

Notes

References

External links
 
 ATP tournament profile

 
Tennis tournaments in the Netherlands
Sports competitions in Rotterdam
Indoor tennis tournaments
Hard court tennis tournaments
Recurring sporting events established in 1972
ATP Tour 500
1972 establishments in the Netherlands